Common names: (none).

Vipera seoanei cantabrica is a venomous viper subspecies endemic to the Cantabrian Mountains in Spain.

Description
This subspecies is described as the fourth (of four) main color-pattern types for V. seoanei—a highly polymorphic species. V. s. cantabrica has a fragmented zigzag pattern that can appear as transverse bands along the back. This morph resembles a pattern seen in V. aspis.

Geographic range
It is found in the south central parts of the Cantabrian Mountains in northern Spain.

The type locality given is "Faro, Caurel (Lugo)."

References

Further reading
Braña F, Bas S. 1983. Vipera seoanei cantabrica ssp n. Munibe Sociedad de Ciencias Aranzadi San Sebastián 35 (1-2): 87-88.

External links
 

seoanei cantabrica
Reptiles described in 1983